The Vadstena bracteate (Rundata Ög 178) is a gold C-bracteate found in the earth at Vadstena, Sweden, in 1774. Along with the bracteate was a gold ring and a piece of gold sheet: all were nearly melted down by a goldsmith who was stopped by a local clergyman. The bracteate was stolen in 1938 from the Swedish Museum of National Antiquities and has not yet been found.

The bracteate is believed to have been made about AD 500. In the middle of the bracteate is a four-legged animal with a man's head above it, and in front of this a bird separated from the other images by a line. This image is commonly associated with the Norse god Odin in bracteate iconography. The bracteate is most famous for containing a full listing of the Elder Futhark runic alphabet. The runes in the futhark are divided by dots into three groups of eight runes which are commonly called an ætt. The entire inscription reads:

tuwatuwa; fuþarkgw; hnijïpzs; tbemlŋo[d]

The last rune (d) is hidden below the necklace holder piece that has been molded on top of the bracteate, but archaeologists know what it is because a duplicate bracteate was found in Motala (image) which read:

(t)uwatuwa; fuþarkgw; hnijïpzs; tbemlŋod.

The first part of the inscription is not yet understood but is assumed to be associated with magic, however this is a common stock-explanation for runic text that has not yet been interpreted.

The Motala bracteate was struck with the same die and was found at a nearby town in the same province, Östergötland, in 1906.

See also

Kylver Stone
Runic magic
Sjælland bracteate 2

References

Elder Futhark inscriptions
Bracteates
Individual items of jewellery
Proto-Norse language